Havaran (also Romanized as Havārān) is a village in Siyahu Rural District, Fin District, Bandar Abbas County, Hormozgan Province, Iran. At the 2006 census, its population was 25, in 8 families.

References 

Populated places in Bandar Abbas County